Bruzolo (pop. 1,525 as of 1-1-2017)) is a comune of the Metropolitan City of Turin in the Italian region Piedmont. Bruzolo borders the following municipalities: Usseglio, Condove, Chianocco, San Didero, and San Giorio di Susa.

The town of Bruzolo is the main population centre of the commune and is its capoluogo. It stands to the left of the river Dora Riparia on an alluvial fan formed over the millennia by debris deposited by the Pissaglio and other minor torrents. The municipal territory also includes farmland and factories on the flood-plain of the Dora Riparia, and extends over the forested southern slopes of Punta Lunella, elevation , where there is a scattering of hamlets: Campobenedetto, Meisonardi, Comba, Bigiardi, Lunera, Coletto, Chiotetti, Seinera and Combette.

See also
Treaty of Bruzolo

References

Cities and towns in Piedmont